Brettenham is a village and civil parish in the Babergh district of Suffolk, England. In 2005 it had a population of 270, increasing to 353 at the 2011 Census.

Almost the entire built-up area is defined as a conservation area, and the parish also contains some ancient woodland at Ram's Wood. The village is home to independent prep school, Old Buckenham Hall.

History
The ancient village is recorded about 1086 in Little Domesday as being within the hundred of Cosford.

The parish became part of Babergh district when it was formed on 1 April 1974 by the merger of Cosford Rural District (1882-1974) with other units of government.

Governance
Brettenham is part of the  electoral ward called Brett Vale. The population of this ward at the 2011 Census was 2,181.

References

External links

Parish Council website
St Mary's Church Suffolk Churches
Old Buckenham Hall School Website

 
Villages in Suffolk
Civil parishes in Suffolk
Babergh District